Future Bounce is a South Korean producer duo under YG Entertainment, consisting of P.K and Dee.P, formed in 2015. They have produced hits for Big Bang, Winner, iKon, Blackpink and Treasure and many other YG artists.

Members

P.K
P.K (birth name: Choi Pil Kang was born on March 2, 1979.

Dee.P
Dee.P (birth name: Park Han-beom was born on June 3, 1983.

Production discography
Before the duo's formation, both members often collaborated.

2012

2014

2015

2016

2017

2018

2019

2020

2021

2022

References

External links
 P.K 
 Dee.P 

American hip hop record producers
American male composers
21st-century American composers
South Korean composers
South Korean hip hop record producers
South Korean record producers
YG Entertainment artists
Musicians from Los Angeles
Living people
Record producers from California
21st-century American male musicians
Year of birth missing (living people)